10-Deacetylbaccatins are a series of closely related natural organic compounds isolated from the yew tree (Genera Taxus).  10-Deacetylbaccatin III is a precursor to the anti-cancer drug docetaxel (Taxotere). 

10-deacetylbaccatin III 10-O-acetyltransferase converts 10-deacetylbaccatin to baccatin III:
acetyl-CoA + 10-deacetylbaccatin III  CoA + baccatin III

External links
  - 7-Epi-10-Deacetylbaccatin III
  - 10-Deacetylbaccatin V
  - 10-Deacetylbaccatin VI
  - 13-Epi-10-Deacetylbaccatin III
  - 13-[3-(2-Naphthyl)prop-2-enoyl]-2-debenzoyl-2-(4-methoxybenzoxyl)-10-deacetylbaccatin III
  - 10-N,N-Dimethylglycyl-13-[3-(2-Naphthyl)prop-2-enoyl]-10-deacetylbaccatin III

Benzoate esters
Secondary alcohols
Tertiary alcohols
Ketones
Diterpenes
Acetate esters